Pano-Tacanan (also Pano-Takana, Pano-Takánan, Pano-Tacana, Páno-Takána) is a proposed family of languages spoken in Peru, western Brazil, Bolivia and northern Paraguay. There are two close-knit branches, Panoan and Tacanan (Adelaar & Muysken 2004; Kaufman 1990, 1994), with 33 languages. There are lexical and grammatical similarities between the two branches, but it has not yet been demonstrated that these are genetic (Loos 1999).

Most Panoan languages are spoken in either Peru or western Brazil; a few are in Bolivia. All Tacanan languages are spoken in Bolivia (Ese’ejja is also spoken in Peru).

Genealogical relations
Migliazza has presented lexical evidence in support of a genetic relationship between the Panoan and Yanomaman languages.  He also suggests that a Panoan–Chibchan relationship is plausible.

Jolkesky (2016) also notes that there are lexical similarities with the Arawakan languages due to contact.

Comparison
Reconstructed pronominal affixes of Panoan and Tacanan are given in the following table:

Bibliography
 Adelaar, Willem F. H.; & Muysken, Pieter C. (2004). The languages of the Andes. Cambridge language surveys. Cambridge University Press.
 Campbell, Lyle. (1997). American Indian languages: The historical linguistics of Native America. New York: Oxford University Press. .
 Kaufman, Terrence. (1990). Language history in South America: What we know and how to know more. In D. L. Payne (Ed.), Amazonian linguistics: Studies in lowland South American languages (pp. 13–67). Austin: University of Texas Press. .
 Kaufman, Terrence. (1994). "The native languages of South America." In C. Mosley & R. E. Asher (Eds.), Atlas of the world's languages (pp. 46–76). London: Routledge.
 Suárez, Jorge A. (1973). Macro-Pano-Tacanan. In International Journal of American Linguistics, Vol. 39, No. 3, pp. 137-154. The University of Chicago Press. Accessed from DiACL.

References

External links

 Proel: Familia Pano-Tacanana
 Proel: Familia Panoana
 Proel: Familia Tacanana

 
Language families
Indigenous languages of South America (Central)